Microaerobacter  is a thermophilic, microaerophilic and anaerobic genus of bacteria from the family of Bacillaceae with one known species (Microaerobacter geothermalis). Microaerobacter geothermali has been isolated from a hot spring from Hammam Sidi, Nabeul, Tunisia.

References

Bacillaceae
Bacteria genera
Monotypic bacteria genera